Augustia is a genus of cave-dwelling leiodid beetle from Herzegovina in the subtribe Bathysciina. Its type and only species is Augustia weiratheri. The first specimens of Augustia weiratheri were collected by the biospeleologist Leo Weirather, from a cave in Čvrsnica that he nicknamed "Vuk jama". Weirather obscured his collection localities using code names in order to guard them from less scrupulous collectors. The species was described and named by Ricardo Zariquiey in 1927. Augustia shares several characteristics with Henrotiella and Weiratheria, and is probably closely related to them. Augustia weiratheri are 3 mm long and reddish.

References

Works cited

Beetles of Europe
Cave beetles
Endemic fauna of Bosnia and Herzegovina
Leiodidae